Adenanthellum is a genus of flowering plants in the daisy family, Asteraceae described as a genus in 1979.

There is only one known species, Adenanthellum osmitoides, endemic to South Africa.

References

Monotypic Asteraceae genera
Endemic flora of South Africa
Anthemideae